The Japanese noctule (Nyctalus furvus) is a species of bat belonging to the family Vespertilionidae. It is endemic to Japan.

References

Mammals described in 1968
Nyctalus
Bats of Asia
Mammals of Japan

Endemic fauna of Japan